Sanga is an East Kainji language of Nigeria belonging to the Shammo cluster.

Distribution
Sanga is spoken about 20 villages of Toro LGA, Bauchi State and Jema'a LGA, Kaduna State.

Akora
Ana Kataki
Anaka’awa
Anakapɔ
Barko
Didim
Gagate
Galma
Gumau
Jee
Jimbiri
Kajanta
Kajole
Kasheeno
Kudeenu
Magami
Majango
Maleera
Nabarka
Shimba I, II
Shimbiri

References

East Kainji languages
Languages of Nigeria